= NGC 3465 =

Spiral galaxy in the constellation Draco

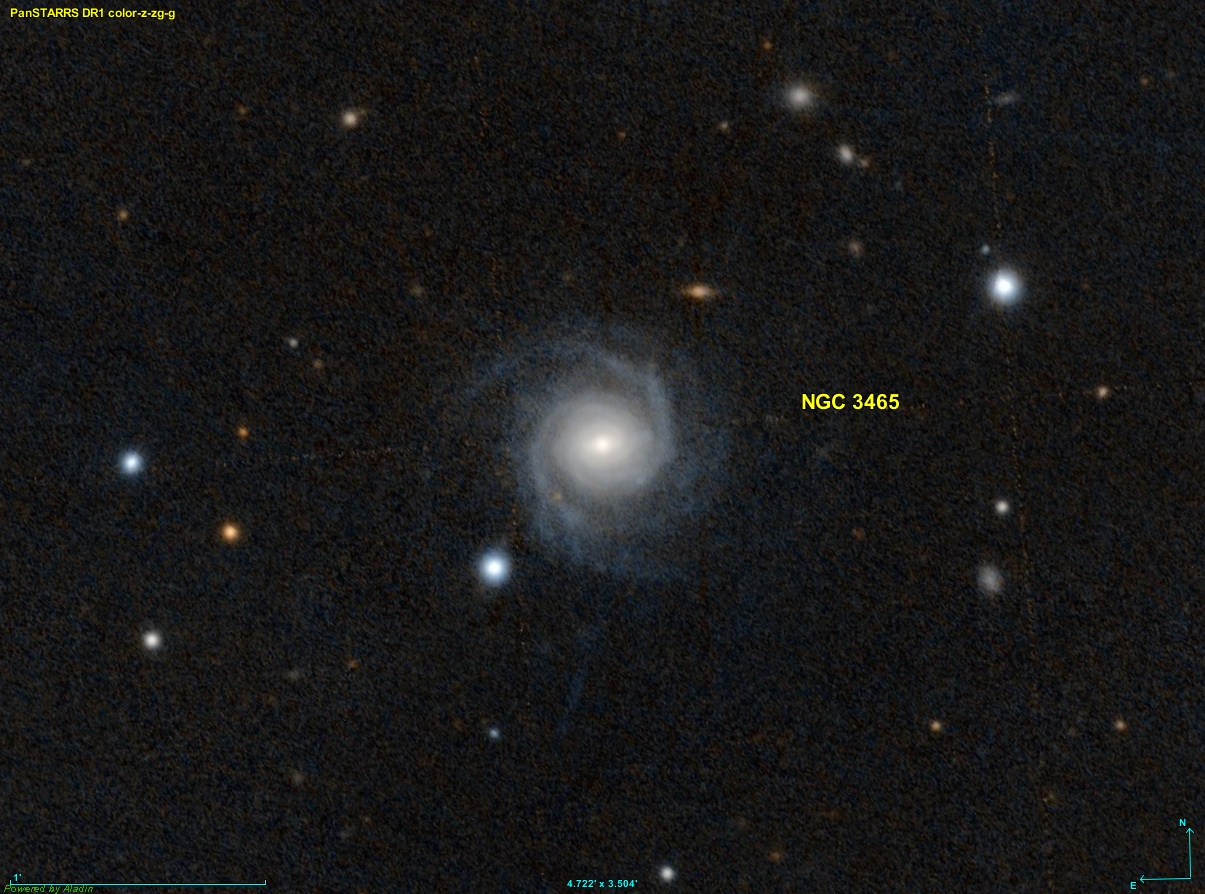
- NGC 3465 imaged by Pan-STARRS

Observation data (J2000 epoch)
- Constellation: Draco
- Right ascension: 10^{h} 59^{m} 31.2700275648^{s}
- Declination: +75° 11′ 28.747929624″
- Distance: 332 Mly (101.82 Mpc)
- Apparent magnitude (B): 14.6
- magnitude (J): 11.856±0.029
- magnitude (H): 11.214±0.041
- magnitude (K): 10.928±0.052

Other designations
- UGC 6056, MCG +13-08-048, CGCG 351-050

NGC 3465 is a spiral galaxy in constellation Draco. It was discovered on April 2, 1801, by William Herschel.

== Supernova ==
One supernova has been observed in NGC 3465: SN 2004bc (Type Ia, mag. 16.5) was discovered by Federico Manzini on 1 April 2004.
